Kipyego is a surname of Kenyan origin that may refer to:

Barselius Kipyego (born 1993), Kenyan long-distance runner
Bernard Kipyego (born 1986), Kenyan marathon runner
Edwin Kipyego (born 1990), Kenyan half marathon runner
Michael Kipyego (born 1983), Kenyan steeplechase and marathon runner
Sally Kipyego (born 1985), Kenyan Olympic 10,000 metres medallist
Christopher Kipyego (born 1975). Kenyan marathon runner

See also
Yego

Kalenjin names